Pervomaysk is a rural locality (a village) and the administrative centre of Pervomaysky Selsoviet, Nurimanovsky District, Bashkortostan, Russia. The population was 355 as of 2010. There are 3 streets.

Geography 
Pervomaysk is located 53 km northeast of Krasnaya Gorka (the district's administrative centre) by road. Sarva is the nearest rural locality.

References 

Rural localities in Nurimanovsky District